The Plumbers Arms is a Grade II listed public house at 14 Lower Belgrave Street, Belgravia, London SW1.

It is where Lady Lucan burst in on the evening of 7 November 1974, covered in blood and fearing for her own life, after discovering that her husband, Lord Lucan, had murdered their nanny, Sandra Rivett. (Lord Lucan's subsequent disappearance means this case has never been tried in court, but his wife identified him as her assailant and he was named as the murderer at the coroner's inquest).

It was built mid-19th century.

References

 

Buildings and structures completed in the 19th century
Belgravia
19th-century architecture in the United Kingdom
Grade II listed pubs in the City of Westminster